Annapurna Mishra was the first Mayor of the East Delhi  Municipal Corporation. She was the first to occupy the office of mayor after the creation of three new local bodies in New Delhi after the municipal elections in 2012. She represents the Sonia Vihar neighborhood in East Delhi as a member of the Bhartiya Janata Party.

Career
She launched a ‘tree plantation drive’ and plans to plant one lakh saplings.
She has instructed officials to come up with a list of chargesheeted employees so that they are not posted on sensitive posts.
In June, she organised a ‘Dengue, Malaria Prevention Month’ 
EDMC was the first corporation to organise camps for the recovery of property tax. Her son Activist Kapil Mishra was a prominent member of Aam Aadmi Party and MLA from Karawal Nagar who has joined the Bharatiya Janata Party on 17 Aug 2019.  She has three daughters, her younger daughter Devsena Mishra is an independent writer and IT leader.

References 

Living people
Bharatiya Janata Party politicians from Delhi
East Delhi district
People from Deoria, Uttar Pradesh
Women mayors of places in Uttar Pradesh
Year of birth missing (living people)